The Vertol VZ-2 (or Model 76) was a research aircraft built in the United States in 1957 to investigate the tiltwing approach to vertical take-off and landing.

Design and development
The aircraft had a fuselage of tubular framework (originally uncovered) and accommodation for its pilot in a helicopter-like bubble canopy. The T-tail incorporated small ducted fans to act as thrusters for greater control at low speeds.

Ground tests began in April 1957 and on 13 August, the VZ-2 took off for the first time in hover mode only. On 23 July 1958, the aircraft made its first full transition from vertical flight to horizontal flight. By the time the test program ended in 1965, the VZ-2 had made some 450 flights, including 34 full transitions. The aircraft has been preserved by the National Air and Space Museum in storage at the Paul E. Garber Preservation, Restoration, and Storage Facility.

Specifications

See also

References

 
 

Z-02, Vertol
Tiltwing aircraft
Vertol VZ-2
NASA aircraft
Single-engined twin-prop tractor aircraft
Turboshaft-powered aircraft
Aircraft first flown in 1957
T-tail aircraft